Saigon Electric also known as Sài Gòn Yo! is a 2011 Vietnamese hip hop film directed by Stephane Gauger. It was released on April 22, 2011, in big cities and provinces in Vietnam such as Hanoi, Saigon, Da Nang and Can Tho.

Plot

A street performer befriends a ribbon dancer named Mai, and their partnership begins to lead to a better life, until a rich kid shows interest in her.

Cast

 Van Trang as Mai
 Quynh Hoa as Kim 
 Ha Pham Anh Hien as Do-Boy
 Khuong Ngoc as Hai
 Elly Tran Ha as Hoa
 Viet Max as Leader of North Killaz
 Phan Tan Thi as "The Professor"
 Nguyen Hau as Director
 Huu Luan as Hai's father
 Kim Xuan as Mai's mother

References

External links
 
 

2011 films
Vietnamese-language films
Vietnamese musical films
2010s hip hop films